La Palma d'Ebre is a municipality in the comarca of Ribera d'Ebre, Tarragona Province, Catalonia, Spain. Despite its name, it is not located close to the Ebre river.  There is a reservoir less than 1 km north of the town.

Monuments
The 12th century Mare de Déu del Roser church, also known as "Església Vella".

References

 Panareda Clopés, Josep Maria; Rios Calvet, Jaume; Rabella Vives, Josep Maria (1989). Guia de Catalunya, Barcelona: Caixa de Catalunya.  (Spanish).  (Catalan).

External links

La Palma d'Ebre Town Hall webpage
 Government data pages 

Municipalities in Ribera d'Ebre
Populated places in Ribera d'Ebre